The Margaret Tait Award is a moving image prize for artists living and working in Scotland. It is named after the Orcadian filmmaker and writer Margaret Tait (1918–99). Recipients of the award have included Alberta Whittle, Charlotte Prodger, Rachel Maclean and Torsten Lauschmann.

History 
The Margaret Tait Award was established in 2010 by Glasgow Film, LUX Scotland, supported by Screen Scotland. The Award is presented annually to a Scottish or Scotland-based artist working in moving image who has produced a significant body of work in the last 5 to 12 years. The winner is awarded £15,000 to produce new work, which is exhibited at the next Glasgow Film Festival.

Selection process 
Artists are selected based on an open call. The winner is decided by a selected jury.

Award winners 

 2021: Andrew Black, The Besom (Shortlisted: Christian Noelle Charles, Winnie Herbstein, Mathew Wayne Parkin and Tako Taal)
2020: Emilia Beatriz (Shortlisted: Sulaïman Majali, Kimberley O’Neill, and Hardeep Pandhal)
 2019: Jamie Crewe, Ashley (Shortlisted: Winnie Herbstein, Margaret Salmon and Stuart Middleton)
 2018: Alberta Whittle, between a whisper and a cry (Shortlisted: Aideen Doran, Rob Kennedy and Corin Sworn)
 2017: Sarah Forrest, April (Shortlisted: Jamie Crewe, Margaret Salmon and Kimberley O’Neill)
 2016: Kate Davis, Charity (Shortlisted: Aideen Doran, Hardeep Pandhal, Catherine Street and Stina Wirfelt)
 2015: Duncan Marquiss, Evolutionary Jerks and Gradualist Creeps (Shortlisted: Kathryn Elkin, Rob Kennedy, and Hardeep Pandhal)
 2014: Charlotte Prodger, The Stoneymollan Trail (Shortlisted: Allison Gibbs, Beagles and Ramsay, Kari Robertson, Kathryn Elkin and Katy Dove)
 2013: Rachel Maclean, A Whole New World (Shortlisted: Michelle Hannah, Rob Kennedy, Sophie Macpherson, Gillian Steel, Sarah Tripp, and Stina Wirfelt)
 2012: Stephen Sutcliffe, Outwork (Shortlisted: Calum Stirling, Katri Walker, Rachel MacLean, Stina Wirfelt and Stuart Gurden)
 2011: Anne-Marie Copestake, And Under That
 2010: Torsten Lauschmann, At The Heart of Everything is a Row of Holes (Shortlisted: Aileen Campbell, Sarah Tripp, Henry Coombes, Alexander and Susan Maris)

References 

Scottish awards
British art awards
Video art